NAVTEX (navigation telex) is an international service that provides navigational and meteorological warnings and forecasts. This list identifies some Navtex stations.

Stations

A list of Navtex stations. Please improve this list by determining the exact location of the transmission antenna!

Station broadcast ranges are in nautical miles.

Navarea 1 – North Atlantic, North Sea, Baltic Sea 

518 kHz (international)

490 kHz (national)

Navarea 2 – East Atlantic

518 kHz (international)

490 kHz (national)

Navarea 3 – Mediterranean Sea 

518 kHz (international)

490 kHz (national)

Navarea 4 – West Atlantic 

518 kHz (international)

490 kHz (national)

Navarea 5 – Brasil 

No NAVTEX stations available

Navarea 6 – Argentina, Uruguay 

518 kHz (international)

490 kHz (national)

Navarea 7 – South Africa 

518 kHz (international)

Navarea 8 – India 

518 kHz (international)

Navarea 9 – Arabia 

518 kHz (international)

Navarea 10 – Australia 

No NAVTEX stations available.

Australia distributes its messages (Maritime Safety Information — MSI) exclusively via Inmarsat-C via EGC (Enhanced Group Call) in SafetyNet.

Navarea 11 – East Asia 

518 kHz (international)

490 kHz (national)

424 kHz (Transmissions in Japanese language)

Navarea 12 – Eastern Pacific 

518 kHz (international)

490 kHz (national)

Navarea 13 – Russia 

518 kHz (international)

Navarea 14 – New Zealand, Southern Pacific 

No NAVTEX stations available.

Navarea 15 – Chile 

518 kHz (international)

Navarea 16 – Peru 

518 kHz (international)

Navtex on 4 MHz (4209.5 kHz)

External links

Navtex station lists & information
 http://www.ndblist.info/datamodes.htm  (archive) : NDBLIST - The NAVTEX DX Section, last updated 24 November 2011.
 http://weather.mailasail.com/Franks-Weather/European-And-Mediterranean-Navtex-Schedules
https://www.guardiacostiera.gov.it/mezzi-e-tecnologie/Pages/rete-navtex.aspx Italian Navtex Stations

Navigational equipment
Maritime communication
Telegraphy
Navigational aids